The Tobler's crow (Euploea tobleri) is a species of nymphalid butterfly in the Danainae subfamily. It is endemic to the Philippines.

References

Euploea
Lepidoptera of the Philippines
Taxonomy articles created by Polbot
Butterflies described in 1878